Eric Gawu (born November 10, 1987) is a Ghanaian football player who, is playing for Dreams.

Career
Had a very good season at King Faisal Babes in the 2004-2005 Ghana league season but could not settle when he made a switch to Hearts of Oak for $160,000. Eric Gawu has gone through torrid periods finding his rhythm, compelling fans of Hearts of Oak to question whether the management of the club made a wise buy. In 2007 FK Sarajevo considered a move for him from Hearts of Oak, the Bosnia & Herzegovina club wanted him on a years contract. On 3 February 2006, he was Transferred to Al Sadd of the Qatar Stars League and turned back after one year to his former club Hearts of Oak.

International
Member of Ghana's 2003-2004 Olympic team, he has played the Ghana National Team on a few occasion.

Honours
Hearts of Oak
Ghana Premier League: 2006–07, 2008–09
Medeama

 Ghanaian FA Cup: 2012–13

References

External links
 

1982 births
Living people
Ghana international footballers
Ghanaian footballers
Accra Hearts of Oak S.C. players
King Faisal Babes FC players
Ashanti Gold SC players
Al Sadd SC players
Hapoel Ashkelon F.C. players
Bnei Sakhnin F.C. players
Dreams F.C. (Ghana) players
Expatriate footballers in Qatar
Expatriate footballers in Israel
Ghanaian expatriate sportspeople in Qatar
Ghanaian expatriate sportspeople in Israel
Israeli Premier League players
Association football forwards